Mirza: The Untold Story  is a 2012 Indian Punjabi-language action romance film written and directed by Baljit Singh Deo. It stars Gippy Grewal and Mandy Takhar in the lead roles, with music rapper Honey Singh in his first commercial venture, as a dunce gangster. Produced by Inda Raikoti and Aman Khatkar, the movie had a historic opening across Punjab.  The movie was released on 6 April 2012.

Plot
Mirza: The Untold Story is based on the legendary love story of Mirza and Sahiba.

Mirza (Gippy Grewal) and his Sahiba (Mandy Takhar) fall in love with each other at a very young age. The plot continues many years later when Mirza and Sahiba return to the same home town where they once grew up together. Jeet (Rahul Dev), Sahiba's oldest brother, is a major gang leader in the city; nonetheless, he still maintains his family's honour. Mirza decides to infiltrate Jeet's gang. The story takes a turn as Mirza meets Sahiba, and their love flourishes once again. This leaves Mirza caught between his love and the hatred he has for her brothers. His battle becomes personal with his leader, Jeet.

Sahiba was a virtuous person who did not desire any bloodshed, but she knows that Jeet and Mirza are both men of strength., and one will end up dead. Until now, she has been sheltered from the real business of the family. Mirza enters Jeet's gang, yet Jeet doesn't know he's after Sahiba. Since Jeet would like Sahiba to marry Deesha (Honey Singh), a fellow mad gang member, Mirza tries to run away with Sahiba. Then, Sahiba and Mirza lodge at the farm cabin, and Sahiba wakes up but feels that her brothers shouldn't be killed and takes out all the bullets from Mirza's gun, on which he depends. Suddenly one of Sahiba's brothers arrive and fights with Mirza. Mirza is winning the fight till he tries to shoot Sahiba's brother and realizes the bullets have been taken out by Sahiba. Jeet then comes and shoots Mirza, and he dies while Sahiba is taken away from Mirza.

Cast
 Gippy Grewal as Mirza
 Mandy Takhar as Saheba
 Rahul Dev as Jeet
 Upinder Randhawa as Bal
 Binnu Dhillon as Daler Singh/Goga Ghasun
 B.N. Sharma as Bahadur Singh/Tehal Singh Takkar
 Honey Singh as Deesha
 Sharik Khan as Deesha's friend
 Jaggi Singh as Navi

Box office
Mirza had the highest opening day collections for a Punjabi film at the time of release and had the second highest opening weekend and week collections only behind Gippy's own movie Jihne Mera Dil Luteya.  The opening week collections of Mirza in Punjab was Rs 24.7 million

PTC Punjabi Film Awards 2013

Mirza: The Untold Story won eight awards at the 3rd PTC Punjabi Film Awards in 2013.

References

External links
Official Facebook Page
Official Website

Indian romantic action films
Films scored by Jatinder Shah
Films scored by Yo Yo Honey Singh
Films set in Punjab, India
Films shot in Rajasthan
Films based on Indian folklore
Punjabi-language Indian films
2010s Punjabi-language films
Films directed by Baljit Singh Deo